This article is a catalog of actresses and models who have appeared on the cover of Harper's Bazaar Spain, the Spanish edition of Harper's Bazaar magazine, starting with the magazine's first issue in March 2010.

2010

2011

2012

2013

2014

2015

2016

2017

2018

2019

2020

External links
 Harper's Bazaar España
 Harper's Bazaar España on Models.com

Spain